The Lynbrook Union Free School District is a public school district serving portions of the southwestern part of the Town of Hempstead. The school district includes most of the Village of Lynbrook and parts of the unincorporated areas of Lynbrook as well as portions of East Rockaway, Hewlett, Hewlett Harbor, and Valley Stream.

At one time the East Rockaway School District proposed paying the Lynbrook district to have East Rockaway students in grades 7 through 12 attend public schools in Lynbrook; the Lynbrook district rejected the offer.

Schools
 Lynbrook Kindergarten Center
 West End Elementary School
 Waverly Park Elementary School
 Marion Street Elementary School
 Lynbrook North Middle School
 Lynbrook South Middle School
 Lynbrook Senior High School

References

External links
 Lynbrook Public Schools
Lynbrook Public Schools (Archive)

Hempstead, New York
School districts in New York (state)
Education in Nassau County, New York